Chukotka is a Russian Project 22220 nuclear-powered icebreaker currently under construction at Baltic Shipyard in Saint Petersburg.

Development and construction

Background 

In the late 1980s, the Russian research institutes and design bureaus developed a successor for the 1970s Arktika-class nuclear-powered icebreakers as part of a wider icebreaker fleet renewal program initiated shortly after the dissolution of the Soviet Union. The new 60-megawatt icebreaker, referred to using a type size series designation LK-60Ya, would feature a so-called dual-draft functionality which would allow the vessel to operate in shallow coastal areas after de-ballasting. Although the preliminary designs had been developed almost two decades earlier, the LK-60Ya design was finalized in 2009 as Project 22220 by Central Design Bureau "Iceberg" and the construction of the first vessel was awarded to Saint Petersburg-based Baltic Shipyard in August 2012. Two additional contracts in May 2014 and August 2019 have increased the number of Project 22220 icebreakers under construction or on order to five. , Russian government reportedly plans to allocate 118 billion rubles for the construction of two additional Project 22220 icebreakers that would be delivered in 2028 and 2029.

Construction 

On 23 August 2019, FSUE Atomflot signed a contract worth over 100 billion rubles (about US$1.5 billion) for the construction of two additional Project 22220 icebreakers with Baltic Shipyard. As before, the Saint Petersburg-based shipyard was the only bidder for the construction of the nuclear-powered icebreakers.

The keel of the fifth Project 22220 icebreaker was laid on 16 December 2020. The vessel, named Chukotka after the Chukotka Autonomous Okrug, is scheduled to be delivered by December 2026.

Design 

Chukotka has a nuclear-turbo-electric powertrain. The onboard nuclear power plant consists of two 175 RITM-200 pressurized water reactors fueled by up to 20% enriched Uranium-235 and two 36 turbogenerators. The propulsion system follows the classic polar icebreaker pattern with three  four-bladed propellers driven by  electric motors.

Notes

References 

Project 22220 icebreakers